Judith Diane Maltby  (born 1957) is an American-born Anglican priest and historian, who specialises in post-Reformation church history and the history of early modern Britain. She has been the chaplain and a Fellow of Corpus Christi College, Oxford, since 1993, and reader in church history at the University of Oxford since 2004.

Early life and education
Maltby was born on 14 October 1957 in the United States. She studied for a double major in English and history at the University of Illinois, graduating in 1979 with a Bachelor of Arts (BA) degree. She undertook postgraduate research in early modern British history at Wolfson College, Cambridge, and then at Newnham College, Cambridge, completing her Doctor of Philosophy (PhD) degree in 1992. Her doctoral thesis was titled Approaches to the Study of Religious Conformity in Late Elizabethan and Early Stuart England: With Special Reference to Cheshire and the Diocese of Lincoln.

Career

Academic career
From 1987 to 1993, Maltby was a tutor in church history at Salisbury and Wells Theological College, an Anglican theological college in Salisbury, Wiltshire, England. In 1993, having been appointed its college chaplain, she was elected a Fellow of Corpus Christi College, Oxford. She is also a member of the Faculty of Theology and Religion, University of Oxford, and was made reader in church history in 2004.

Maltby's main research interests are church history and the history of early modern Britain. Particular interests include "16th and 17th century English religion", "liturgy and the history of the Church of England", ecumenism, and "Anglican responses to persecution during the 1640–50s".

In 1999, Maltby was elected a Fellow of the Royal Historical Society (FRHistS).

Ordained ministry
From 1989 to 1992, Maltby trained for Holy Orders on the Southern Theological Education and Training Scheme. She was ordained in the Church of England as a deacon in 1992. From 1992 to 1993, she was an honorary parish deacon at the Parish of Wilton with Netherhampton & Fugglestone in the Diocese of Salisbury. She was ordained as a priest on 17 April 1994 by Richard Harries, Bishop of Oxford, and was thus among the first women ordained to the priesthood in the Church of England.

Since 1993, Maltby has been the chaplain of Corpus Christi College, Oxford. She has also been honorary canon theologian of Leicester Cathedral since 2004, and canon theologian of Winchester Cathedral since 2011. In 2006, she was made an honorary canon of Christ Church Cathedral, Oxford.

Views
Maltby opposed the creation of provincial episcopal visitors for opponents of the ordination of women.

Selected works

See also
 Women and the Church

References

1957 births
Living people
American historians of religion
American women historians
Reformation historians
British women historians
Historians of Christianity
Historians of the United Kingdom
Fellows of Corpus Christi College, Oxford
Historians of the University of Oxford
University of Illinois alumni
Alumni of Wolfson College, Cambridge
Alumni of Newnham College, Cambridge
20th-century English Anglican priests
21st-century English Anglican priests
Fellows of the Royal Historical Society
Anglican scholars
Women Anglican clergy